Temu, LLC is an American-based online marketplace. Most products are shipped to consumers from China. It is a subsidiary of Chinese-based PDD Holdings Inc., which also owns Pinduoduo.

History and business model
Temu is owned and operated by PDD Holdings, which also owns Pinduoduo, a popular social commerce platform in China. Through WhaleCo Inc. Temu is labeled as headquartered in Boston. The platform first went live in the United States in September 2022.

Temu allows Chinese vendors to sell and shop directly to US customers without having to rely on warehouses in the US. Temu provides free goods to some users who successfully encourage new users via affiliate codes, social media, and through gamification. 

Temu was the most frequently downloaded app in the United States from September 2022 to early January 2023. According to Time, despite its popularity due to these promotions and low prices, Temu "is also starting to develop a reputation for undelivered packages, mysterious charges, incorrect orders, and unresponsive customer service." Temu used a variety of online ads on Facebook and Instagram. According to TechCrunch, "These ads appear to be working to boost Temu's installs. But dig into the app’s reviews and you'll find similar complaints to Wish, including scammy listings, damaged and delayed deliveries, incorrect orders and lack of customer service." In a March 2023 review for Tom's Guide, the reviewer recommended against ordering any glassware from the company as the packaging was poor some of the products were broken or cosmetically damaged.

On February 3, 2023, Temu launched in Canada. That same month, the company aired a Super Bowl ad.

See also 
 List of online marketplaces

References 

American companies established in 2022
Online marketplaces of the United States